Coleocentrus excitator is a parasitoid wasp in the family Ichneumonidae that parasitizes the long-horned beetle species Ergates faber.

References

Ichneumonidae
Insects described in 1761
Taxa named by Nikolaus Poda von Neuhaus